Stanislav Gomozkov is a former male international table tennis player from Soviet Union.

Table tennis career
He won three World Championship medals including a gold medal in the Mixed Doubles event with Tatiana Ferdman at the World Table Tennis Championships in 1975.

He also won seven English Open titles.

See also
 List of table tennis players
 List of World Table Tennis Championships medalists

References

Soviet table tennis players
Year of birth missing (living people)
Living people